Patricia Major Dineen (c. 1936 – February 15, 1961) was an American ice dancer who competed with her husband Robert Dineen. The duo won the Silver (Junior) dance title at the 1960 United States Figure Skating Championships and then the bronze at the senior level at the 1961 United States Figure Skating Championships, earning them the right to compete a month later at the World Championships in Prague.  She and her husband died on February 15, 1961, when Sabena Flight 548 crashed en route to the World Championships.  They left behind an infant son, Robert Jr., who was adopted by an uncle.

The Dineens lived in New York City where they were coached by Sonya Klopfer.  Patricia Dineen had a high school education and worked as a clerk.

Results
Ice Dance (with Dineen)

References

External links
U.S. Figure Skating biography

1930s births
1961 deaths
American female ice dancers
Victims of aviation accidents or incidents in Belgium
Year of birth unknown
Victims of aviation accidents or incidents in 1961
20th-century American women